The Creation of the Animals is a 1550 or 1552 oil on canvas painting by Tintoretto, acquired for the Doge's Palace in 1928, restored in 1967 and now in the Gallerie dell'Accademia.

References

Paintings depicting figures from the Book of Genesis
1550 paintings
1552 paintings
Paintings by Tintoretto
Paintings in the Gallerie dell'Accademia
Birds in art